Rachel Dawn Amber is a fictional character in the Life Is Strange video game series by Square Enix. Created by Dontnod Entertainment for the original Life Is Strange game released in 2015, Rachel's character was significantly expanded upon by Deck Nine for a prequel game titled Life Is Strange: Before the Storm released in 2017. 

Her character is introduced in the eponymous Life Is Strange as an affluent, popular student who is the former best friend of character Chloe Price. She attended the protagonist Max Caulfield's school and has mysteriously vanished, serving as one theme of the story. In the prequel game Life Is Strange: Before the Storm, Rachel is a main character and forms a relationship with protagonist Chloe, which is optionally romantic. 

Rachel's character was noted as an important theme in the original game and her portrayal in Before the Storm was generally received positively by critics and attracted fans. Commentators noted and criticized the eventual reveal of her being kidnapped and subsequently murdered in the original Life Is Strange as an LGBT variation of the "women in refrigerators" trope.

Concept and development

Dontnod Entertainment (Life Is Strange) 
Michel Koch, the co-director and art director, stated in a January 2016 interview with Shacknews: "We really wanted to push [Rachel Amber as] this mysterious character that you never see. We really tried to create her and have characters talk about her to the point that she was in the game, even if you never see her. We really have her be one of the main characters, but one that's never see." Koch also stated that DontNod wanted her character arc to subvert favored plot directions by audiences, since the game was "about real life" and "not a fantasy game".

Deck Nine (Before the Storm) 
After publisher Square Enix chose Deck Nine to develop a Life Is Strange game, the developers chose a prequel expanding upon the plot threads established within the original game. Within Before the Storm, they wanted to focus upon and establish Rachel Amber's relationship with Chloe Price. In a November 2017 interview with Engadget, Deck Nine's game director Chris Floyd stated that the team wanted to establish "that she was lovable. Extremely lovable, especially as we're seeing her through Chloe's eyes. And yet, we also know a lot of troubling things about her from season one. So we had to include a touch of that as well."

In a March 2018 interview with Game Informer, Deck Nine lead writer Zak Garriss stated that the development of Rachel was "one of the biggest challenges in Before the Storm as a whole. We had instruction from the first game in that her absence from the story and characters' lives was felt. You could talk to every character, especially in the first episode, and someone would have something to say about Rachel." Writing that it was a challenge to build her "as a compelling character. We just did our best with it. But it was fun. I think we all thought and wrote about people we've met in our lives that defined chapters for whatever reason. Your first love, the person who breaks your heart, someone who says something at just the right time and place to change the way you think about a fundamental facet of your life. We all have these people and we really focused on that and drew on that in building and creating Rachel." Garris stated that the team wanted to leave it deliberately ambiguous on whether Rachel possessed some form of powers similar to that of other characters within the series. Saying that they wanted the story to primarily focus on "her ability to light Chloe up and change the spaces that she's in... [that] is really her gift".

Fictional biography and portrayal

Life Is Strange (2015) 
Rachel's six-month long disappearance acts as the theme for the events of the story, which concludes with her dead body being found. Rachel is initially introduced as an affluent and popular student of Blackwell Academy who mysteriously vanishes without explanation.

Rachel is stated to be the best friend of character Chloe Price and is implied to have had illicit romantic and/or sexual relationship with art teacher Mark Jefferson. Throughout town, missing persons posters, including those put up by Price, are seen throughout the town of Arcadia Bay. Although many within the town initially dismiss concern about her situation, believing that she ran away from her parents to the town of Los Angeles, it is gradually revealed through the investigation of Max Caulfield and Price that her disappearance was the result of malicious activity. Eventually, her body is discovered by Caulfield and Price at the Arcadia Bay junkyard. It is revealed that she had been kidnapped by Jefferson and student Nathan Prescott, dying of a drug overdose.

Beyond being murdered under unknown circumstances, it is left ambiguous on who killed Rachel and whether her death was intentional. Jefferson claims that Rachel was accidentally killed by Prescott in an attempt to render her unconscious. However, it is established that Jefferson is an unreliable narrator, and other parts of the story seem to conversely suggest that Jefferson intentionally murdered her. Alexander Ulyanov of PopMatters describes her character in the game as "a looming presence that informs and motivates the story from behind the scenes and beyond the grave."

Life Is Strange: Before the Storm (2017) 
Rachel forms a relationship with protagonist Chloe, which is optionally romantic. 

A post-credit scene shows Chloe calling Rachel's phone seventeen times without a response.

Other appearances 
Rachel makes a brief cameo appearance in the DLC Life Is Strange: Wavelengths as a friend of Steph Gingrich and Chloe Price in a flashback.

Reception 
In Life Is Strange, Alexander Ulyanov of PopMatters noted an intentional "allusion" to the character of Laura Palmer from television series Twin Peaks, whose death similarly served as a similar theme for the events of the series. According to Ulyanov, Rachel was referred to as Jessie Palmer during game development. The portrayal of Chloe and Rachel's relationship in Before the Storm has been cited by several publications, including Gayming Magazine, as a positive example of LGBT relationships in gaming. 

Critics including Kotaku noted her character as an intentional allusion or subversion of the manic pixie dream girl archetype. Jessica Conditt of Engadget labeled her in Before the Storm as a "darker" version of the typification: labeling Rachel's depiction within the game as a form of a "manic pixie nightmare girl"; a term which Deck Nine game director Floyd agreed with. Similarly, Ulyanov described her character as "a representative of that inner force that awakens all of a sudden, by its own laws, and makes every young person feel like he or she is the main character of this life."

Use of trope and reactions 
The conclusion of Rachel's storyline in Life Is Strange, which it is revealed that she had been kidnapped and subsequently murdered, received negative response from critics and scholars; with Rock Paper Shotgun's Jessica Castello citing it as an LGBT variation of the "women in refrigerators" trope. Other criticisms of the narrative's conclusion related to claims that it was exploitative, simplistic, sensational, and cliché.

In the journal Gaming Studies, reviewers Holger Pötzsch and Agata Waszkiewicz panned Rachel's character arc in the original Life Is Strange, saying that it ultimately concluded in being a disappointing storyline "centred upon a generic evil guy who abuses the boy... and who plays around with the limp bodies of once self-confidently acting and succeeding women in his high-tech bunker--the dark room." Castello argued that it undercut the emotional impact of Life Is Strange: Before the Storm, saying that while "Deck Nine did an admirable job in telling Chloe and Rachel’s story" it ultimately rendered a story in which... "When bad things happen to them, it just feels unfair because we already know that they suffer enough. When they’re happy, it’s only a reminder that it will be all too fleeting."

Reaction from Life Is Strange and Before the Storm development teams 
Michel Koch, co-director and art director of the original Life Is Strange, said during a January 2016 interview with Shacknews about the conclusion of her character arc in Life Is Strange that "It's quite hard, quite dark, the way you discover her, but that's something we also wanted to push... it's like some times in real life, when you have someone that's been missing for months. Most of the time, the reality is, that person is dead. We knew for a lot of players, there was this fantasy of finding her alive or that she was a time travel or she was something else. But for us, Life Is Strange is not a fantasy game, even if there were sci-fi elements. It was about real life and it was something dark and hard, but the most logical outcome was that maybe she's dead." 

Before the Storm's lead writer Zak Garriss, said in an April 2018 interview that internally the developers were heavily divided about the conclusion of Rachel's story and that "he didn’t want to do that... I very deliberately didn’t want to do that. Other devs... actually made the choice to do that in response to a very particular note we got. And when I saw it, I was really upset... — and I know this sounds silly — it was a little bit too far for me. I didn’t like actively showing that right outside of frame, something is happening in the moment. It felt like a little more visceral than I wanted to go... “I still think about it. I think I’m not done thinking about it. But with "that final moment, [we’re not trying] to shock our players or punch them in the stomach or anything like that, but simply do something that I think this medium alone can really do, which is make you feel the way Chloe felt". One of the final scenes of Before the Storm shows Chloe calling Rachel's phone seventeen times without a response.

Notes and references

Notes

References

Life Is Strange
Video game characters introduced in 2015
LGBT characters in video games
Female characters in video games
Fictional characters from Oregon
Square Enix characters